"Stranger in My Mirror" is a song written by Skip Ewing and Kim Williams, and recorded by American country music artist Randy Travis.  It was released in March 1999 as the fourth and final single from his album You and You Alone.  It peaked at number 16 on the Hot Country Singles & Tracks (now Hot Country Songs) chart and at number 20 on the Canadian RPM Country Tracks chart.

Chart performance
"Stranger in My Mirror" debuted at number 61 on the U.S. Billboard Hot Country Singles & Tracks for the week of March 6, 1999.

References

1999 singles
1998 songs
Randy Travis songs
Songs written by Skip Ewing
Song recordings produced by Byron Gallimore
Song recordings produced by James Stroud
Song recordings produced by Randy Travis
DreamWorks Records singles
Songs written by Kim Williams (songwriter)